|}

The Maghull Novices' Chase is a Grade 1 National Hunt steeplechase in Great Britain which is open to horses aged five years or older. It is run at Aintree over a distance of about 2 miles (1 mile 7 furlong and 176 yards, or 3,178 metres), and during its running there are twelve fences to be jumped. The race is for novice chasers, and it is scheduled to take place each year during the Grand National meeting in early April.

The event was established in 1954, and it has been known by various titles. It is currently named after Maghull, a town located to the north of Aintree. For a period the race was classed at Grade 2 level, and it was promoted to Grade 1 status in 1995.

The Maghull Novices' Chase usually features horses which ran previously in the Arkle Challenge Trophy, and the last to win both events was Shishkin in 2021.

Records
Leading jockey since 1977 (3 wins):
 Ruby Walsh – Le Roi Miguel (2003), Twist Magic (2007), Tataniano (2010)

Leading trainer since 1977 (8 wins):
 Paul Nicholls – Flagship Uberalles (1999), Armaturk (2002), Le Roi Miguel (2003), Twist Magic (2007), Tataniano (2010), San Benedeto (2017), Diego Du Charmil (2018)

Winners

See also
 Horse racing in Great Britain
 List of British National Hunt races

References

 Racing Post:

 
 aintree.co.uk – 2010 John Smith's Grand National Media Guide.
 pedigreequery.com – Maghull Novices' Chase – Aintree.

External links
 Race Recordings 

National Hunt races in Great Britain
Aintree Racecourse
National Hunt chases
Recurring sporting events established in 1954
1954 establishments in England